William Allan Neilson (28 March 1869 – 1946) was a Scottish-American educator, writer and lexicographer, graduated in the University of Edinburgh in 1891 and became a PhD in Harvard University in 1898. He was president of Smith College between 1917 and 1939.

Neilson was born in Doune, Scotland and he emigrated to the United States in 1895, being naturalised 3 August 1905. He taught at Bryn Mawr College from 1898 to 1900, Harvard from 1900 to 1904, Columbia from 1904 to 1906, and Harvard again from 1906 to 1917.
Neilson was author of a number of critical works on William Shakespeare, Robert Burns and the Elizabethan theatre, editor of the Cambridge and Tudor editions of Shakespeare (1906, 1911) and editor of Webster's New International Dictionary, Second Edition (1934). Less known is his translation of the famous late 14th century Middle English alliterative chivalric romance Sir Gawain and the Green Knight.

Works
 The Origins and Sources of the "Court of Love"  (1899)
 Milton's Minor Poems (1909); 1919 edition
 Essentials of Poetry (1912) 
 with Ashley Horace Thorndike: The Facts About Shakespeare (1913)
 Lectures on the Harvard Classics (1914)
 Robert Burns, Project Gutenberg books.google (1917)
 Sir Gawain And The Green Knight (transl. by William Allan Neilson) (1917)
 with Ashley Horace Thorndike: History of English Literature (1920)

Further reading
 Margaret Farrand Thorp, Neilson of Smith (1956)

External links
 
 
 
 
 Allison Lockwood, "Making of a president: Smith College's William Allan Neilson," Daily Hampshire Gazette, 8 May 2010.
 William Allan Neilson personal papers at the Smith College Archives, Smith College Special Collections
 Office of President William Allan Neilson files at the Smith College Archives, Smith College Special Collections

References

1869 births
1946 deaths
American lexicographers
American literary critics
Scottish emigrants to the United States
Scottish lexicographers
Scottish literary critics
Scottish scholars and academics
Alumni of the University of Edinburgh
Bryn Mawr College faculty
Harvard University faculty
Columbia University faculty
People from Stirling (council area)
Harvard University alumni
Fellows of the Medieval Academy of America
Presidents of Smith College
Presidents of the Modern Language Association